The XIX International AIDS Conference was a conference held in Washington, D.C. from 22 to 27 July 2012 at the Walter E. Washington Convention Center, run by the International AIDS Society.

Theme
The theme of the conference is "Turning the Tide Together". The meaning of the theme is that because of recent advances in HIV treatment and prevention and increased evidence that it is possible to scale up interventions, communities have new opportunities to change the historical course of HIV infection.

Speakers
The conference featured many leaders in fields relating to HIV.

Response of host city
The International AIDS Society formally announced that Washington D.C. would host the conference on February 25, 2011.  On February 23 Mayor Vincent C. Gray announced the creation of the Mayor's Commission on HIV/AIDS, which is a city board which has the mission to promote treatment and HIV prevention.  Gray stated that the conference would bring $22–25 million to the city as delegates stayed in hotels, ate in restaurants, and enjoyed city entertainment.

References

External links
 

International AIDS Conferences
International conferences in the United States
2012 in the United States
2012 in Washington, D.C.
2012 conferences
July 2012 events in the United States